Shad Mehrak (also Romanized as Shād Mehrak; also known as Mehrābād) is a village in Rivand Rural District, in the Central District of Nishapur County, Razavi Khorasan Province, Iran. At the 2006 census, its population was 694, in 166 families.

References 

Populated places in Nishapur County